The 2015–16 Slovak Cup, also known as Slovnaft Cup for sponsorship reasons, was the 47th edition of the competition.  The winners of the competition will qualify for the First qualifying round of the 2016–17 UEFA Europa League.

Teams

First round
The matches took place on 24, 25, 26, 29 July and 5 and 6 August 2015.

|-

	

	

|}

Second round
The matches took place on 11, 12, 18, 19, and 25 August 2015.

|-

	

|}

Third round
The matches took place on 1 September 2015.

Fourth round
Fourth round matches were played between 13, 14, 20 and 28 October 2015. All times are CET (UTC+1).

Final stage

Bracket

Round of 16
Round of 16 matches were played on 3, 4 and 11 November 2015. All times are CET (UTC+1).

Quarter-finals
Quarter-finals were played on 15 and 16 March 2016. All times are CET (UTC+1).

Semi-finals
Semi-finals were played on 5–6 April and 12–13 April 2016. All times are CET (UTC+1).

First leg

Second leg

Final

The final was played on 29 April 2016.

References

External links
 Slovak Cup at Futbalnet.sk
 Slovak Cup at Soccerway.com

Slovak Cup seasons
Cup
Slovak Cup